HD 225218 is a quadruple star system in the northern constellation of Andromeda. The primary component, HD 225218 A, is a giant star with a stellar classification of B9III, an apparent magnitude of 6.16, and is a candidate Lambda Boötis star. It has a fainter, magnitude 9.65 companion, HD 225218 B, at an angular separation of 5.2″ along a position angle of 171°. The primary itself has been identified as a binary star system through interferometry, with the two components separated by 0.165″. The pair, HD 225218 Aa and Ab, orbit each other with a period of about 70 years and an eccentricity of 0.515. Component B is likewise a spectroscopic binary.

References

External links
 Image HD 225218

Andromeda (constellation)
225218
4
B-type giants
9105
000365
Durchmusterung objects